Bitama is a village in western Eritrea.

Location

Nearby towns and villages include Sebderat, Teseney, Ghirmayka, Elit, Algheden, Arcugi, Giamal Biscia and Adendema.

Villages in Eritrea